The Real Thing is a live double LP album by saxophonist Houston Person which was recorded in Detroit in 1973 and released on the Eastbound label.

Track listing 
 "You Are the Sunshine of My Life" (Stevie Wonder) – 8:55
 "Since I Fell for You" (Buddy Johnson) – 6:23
 "Until It's Time for You to Go" (Buffy Sainte-Marie) – 4:10
 "Pain" (Ohio Players) – 13:50
 "Angel Eyes" (Matt Dennis, Earl Brent) – 7:05	
 "Easy Walker" (Billy Taylor) – 8:30
 "Kittitian Carnival" (Sonny Phillips) – 7:15
 "Could It Be I'm Falling in Love" (Melvin Steals, Mervin Steals) – 4:20
 "Where Is the Love" (Ralph MacDonald, William Salter) – 4:00
 "'Tain't Nobody's Bizness If I Do" (Porter Grainger, Everett Robbins) – 3:50	
 "Don't Go to Strangers" (Redd Evans, Arthur Kent, Dave Mann) – 3:50
 "Crazy Legs" (Donald Austin, Woody Wilson) – 6:48

Personnel 
Houston Person – tenor saxophone
Marcus Belgrave (tracks 4, 7, 8 & 12), Donald Townes (track 7) – trumpet
Eli Fountain − alto saxophone (track 7)
Wild Bill Moore − tenor saxophone (track 7)
Jack McDuff (track 5), Jim Watson (tracks 1, 2, 10 & 11), Sonny Phillips (tracks 3, 4, 6–8 & 12) − organ
Grant Green (tracks 2, 4–6, 8 & 12), Robert Lowe Jr. (tracks 1, 3, 4 & 7–12) − guitar
James Jamerson – bass (tracks 4, 8 & 12)
Hank Brown (tracks 1–3, 7, 9, 10 & 12), Idris Muhammad (tracks 4–6, 8 & 12) −drums
Buddy Caldwell − congas, tambourine (tracks 1, 4 & 7–11) 
Etta Jones (tracks 10 & 11), Spanky Wilson (track 3) − vocals

References 

1973 live albums
Houston Person live albums
Albums produced by Bob Porter (record producer)